Witteveen is  a Dutch toponymic surname and may refer to the following people:

 Arthur Witteveen (b. 19??), Dutch judge and legal writer
 Dave Witteveen (b. 19??), New Zealand association footballer
 David Witteveen (born 1985), Austrian football forward
 Gepke Witteveen (born 1951), Dutch actor and director
 Ivonne Witteveen (born 1944), Dutch Antillean fencer
 Johan Witteveen (1921–2019), Dutch Minister of Finance 1963–71, economist, and author
 (1871–1927), Dutch racing cyclist
 Lucien Witteveen (born 1969), Dutch rapper known as MC Miker G
 Merel Witteveen (born 1985), Dutch yacht racer
 Solange Witteveen (born 1976), Argentine high jumper
 Willem Witteveen (1952–2014), Dutch legal scholar, politician, and author

Dutch-language surnames
Dutch toponymic surnames